Matthias Drawe (born 4 February 1963 in East Berlin) is a German filmmaker, writer, actor and journalist.

Life and work
Drawe grew up in a DEFA building at the border of Potsdam-Babelsberg and West Berlin. In 1970 he managed to defect to West Berlin together with his father, Hans Drawe, a former DEFA dramatist, and his mother in a spectacular escape. Risking their lives, they jumped over the Berlin Wall by using an unsecured film ladder.

At the beginning of the 1980s Drawe lived in a squatted house in Berlin-Kreuzberg, taking part in the fight for affordable housing, which provides the backdrop for his novel Wild Years in West Berlin.

In 1987, through a mutual friend, he met Turkish director Serif Gören who had directed the critically acclaimed Yol - The Path (1982) for the incarcerated Yilmaz Güney. Gören had chosen Berlin-Kreuzberg, which has a high concentration of Turkish immigrants, as the backdrop for his comedy Polizei (1988) starring Turkish actor Kemal Sunal. Gören cast Drawe as a small-time crook.

Inspired by Gören, Drawe took up filmmaking in 1988 shooting The Art of Being a Man (1989) on Russian black and white stock smuggled into West-Berlin from East Germany. In 1991 he founded Kellerkino a small art-house cinema in Berlin-Kreuzberg, which specialized in independent films and screened the early shorts of the then unknown Florian Henckel von Donnersmarck, who would later win an Oscar for The Lives of Others.

After having shot The King of Kreuzberg (1990) and The Ivory Tower (1992) in Berlin, Drawe moved to New York City and worked as a journalist for Deutschlandradio Kultur, the German equivalent of NPR. Drawe's radio features from around the world were brought to life by voice actor Christian Brückner, who provides the official German voice for Robert De Niro, thereby giving German listeners the impression that it was De Niro reporting.

Filmography

 1988: Polizei (actor), Director: Şerif Gören
 1989: The Art of Being a Man (screenplay, director, actor)
 1990: The King of Kreuzberg (screenplay, director, actor) - nominated for the :de:Max Ophüls Preis (Max Ophüls Award)
 1992: The Ivory Tower (screenplay, director, actor)
 1994: Lutz & Hardy ZDF TV series with Karl Lieffen and Hans Korte(screenplays for pilot and first episode; together with Hans Drawe)

Fiction
 2014: Wild Years in West-Berlin, novel
 2016: Free Lunch in New York City, novel

Radio Journalism (selection)
 2002: Tijuana's Fence - Cross-border Experiences in Mexico
 2002: Kinga and Micky - Selling Shoes in Manhattan
 2002: Marvelous Mumpies - Being Fat is Beautiful - in Jamaica
 2003: Hope is my Reward - Stand-up Comedians in New York
 2003: My Life is a Beach - Carnival Blues in Copacabana
 2004: Merely Be Funny! - A Foreigner's Job Search in Tokyo
 2004: Haiti 2004 - A Country in Turmoil
 2005: Point Barrow Alaska - The northernmost Point in the USA

References

External links 
 
 Matthias Drawe at filmportal.de (German)

Deutschlandradio
Mass media people from Berlin
1963 births
Living people